Kalbaskraal is a settlement in the Swartland Local Municipality in the Western Cape province of South Africa. It was established in 1898 at the site of a railway junction for the narrow gauge railway to Hopefield and eventually Saldanha.

References

Populated places in the Swartland Local Municipality